Don't Get Personal is a 1936 American comedy film directed by William Nigh and written by George Waggner, Clarence Marks and Houston Branch. The film stars James Dunn, Sally Eilers, Pinky Tomlin, Spencer Charters, Doris Lloyd and George Cleveland. The film was released on February 12, 1936, by Universal Pictures.

Plot

Cast  
James Dunn as Bob
Sally Eilers as Jinxy
Pinky Tomlin as Arthur
Spencer Charters as Mr. Van Ranesoleer
Doris Lloyd as Mrs. Van Ronesoleer
George Cleveland as Farmer
Lillian Harmer as Farmer's Wife
Charles Coleman as The Butler
George Meeker as Fred
Jean Rogers as Blondy
Lucille Lund as Bridesmaid

References

External links 
 

1936 films
American comedy films
1936 comedy films
Universal Pictures films
Films directed by William Nigh
American black-and-white films
1930s English-language films
1930s American films